The Pridnestrovie Communist Party (PCP) is a communist party in the unrecognized state of Transnistria. The party was led by Oleg Khorzhan until his arrest and imprisonment in 2018.

The party newspaper is the Russian-language biweekly Pravda Pridnestrovya. It is printed in Georgia and sold locally in Transnistria; digital copies are also available online.

History 
The PCP first fielded candidates in the 2005 legislative election but did not win any seats.

Nadezhda Bondarenko, an editor of the official party newspaper Pravda Pridnestrovya and a member of the party's central committee, was the PCP's candidate in the 2006 presidential election. She received 8.1% of the vote, coming second to Smirnov, who won his fourth term in office with 82.4% of the vote.

Khorzhan and Bondarenko were arrested on 11 March 2007 while handing out leaflets ahead of an anti-Smirnov rally, and were sentenced to three-day's detention as an administrative punishment. Two days later on 13 March, a communist demonstration took place in the capital Tiraspol against growing consumer prices and energy tariffs. Demonstrators also demanded the release of the two detained PCP leaders.

During Yevgeny Shevchuk's term as President of Transnistria from 2011 to 2016, PCP legislative members supported nearly all of his initiatives, even unpopular ones such as the reduction of government salaries and pensions by 30%. Party leaders insisted however, that they were legitimate opposition to Shevchuk, and rejected accusations of being fake opposition.

Transnistrian authorities arrested Khorzhan again on 6 June 2018, this time for allegedly assaulting law enforcement. Several other party members had been arrested by authorities prior to Khorzhan, including his wife, his son, and Tiraspol city council deputy Alexander Samoniy. On 3 November 2018, the Supreme Court of Transnistria found Khorzan guilty of his alleged crimes, and he was sentenced to four and a half years in prison and ordered to pay a hefty fine.

Electoral results

Parliamentary

Presidential

Notes

References

External links 
  

Communist parties in Moldova
Political parties in Transnistria
Communism in Transnistria